Langara College (snəw̓eyəɬ leləm̓ in Halkomelem) is a public degree-granting college in Vancouver, British Columbia, Canada, which serves approximately 22,000 students annually through its university, career, and continuing studies programs. The college takes its name from the neighbourhood in which it is situated, which was named after Spanish Admiral Juan de Lángara.

History
Langara College courses and programs were first offered in 1965 at King Edward Centre as part of Vancouver City College. Since 1970, the current campus on West 49th Avenue has housed Langara's programs for almost 50 years. On April 1, 1994, Langara College was established as an independent public college under the Provincial College and Institute Act. Langara College Continuing Studies was established in 1997. To provide more space, a new classroom and office building was opened in January 1997. The new library/classroom building was opened in September 2007. Langara College began the construction of the Science and Technology Building in 2013 as part of Phase II (of IV) of the Master Plan to upgrade and expand the campus. Construction was officially completed in September 2016.

Name
Musqueam, whose unceded territory Langara currently occupies, gave the traditional name snəw̓eyəɬ leləm̓ meaning 'house of teachings' to the college in January 2016. snəw̓eyəɬ references advice given to children to guide them into adulthood and build their character. This is the first time that a British Columbia First Nation gave an indigenous name to a public, post-secondary institution.

Programs and courses
Programs and courses at Langara College are delivered in the following subject areas:
 Arts
 Business
 Health
 Humanities & Social Sciences
 Science & Technology

University studies
Langara College provides university-level programs and courses and offers a variety of qualifications, including baccalaureate degrees, associate degrees, diplomas, certificates, and citations. The three 4-year degree programs offered by the college are Nursing, Recreation Management, and Business Administration. Langara's wide range of academic programs in more than 60 subject areas are offered over three semesters per year. Langara is a popular choice for university transfer students due to smaller class sizes, excellent support services, and competitive tuition fees. More students transfer to BC universities from Langara College than from any other college in the province.

Career Studies
Langara College offers career programs leading to one-year certificates, two-year diplomas, and four-year bachelor's degrees in fields that lead to careers in business, industry, community services, and the arts. Although some of Langara's career programs require that students complete the program within a specific time period, many of the programs can be completed on a part-time basis.

Continuing Studies
Langara College's Continuing Studies department offers over 700 courses and 35 certificate programs year-round. The department's strategic objective is to provide lifelong learning opportunities to meet the individual needs of students. There are 4479 Continuing Studies students in the Fall 2016 term.

Studio 58
Studio 58, Langara College's School of Theatre Arts offers professional theatre training for actors and production personnel. The program ranked within the Top five theatre schools in Canada in 2006. The school auditions hundreds of people across Canada but only sixteen students are accepted per semester. The school has around 72 students for both its three-year acting program, and two-year production program.  The School of Theatre Arts is currently led by Artistic Director Kathryn Shaw.

Student Media
Student media includes the newspaper The Voice, operated by the college's Journalism Program.

Transportation 
The 49 TransLink bus route runs to Langara; as well as the Langara–49th Avenue SkyTrain station provides light rail transport to the campus.

Notable alumni
 Adrian Holmes
 Alison Acheson
 Daniel Doheny
 Ujjal Dosanjh
 Joey Haywood
 Catherine Kallin
 Gary Mason
 Colin Mochrie
 Gaurav Sharma
 Sam Sullivan
 Kristi Pinderi

See also

 List of colleges in British Columbia
 List of universities in British Columbia
 Higher education in British Columbia
 Education in Canada

References

External links

 
1994 establishments in British Columbia
Educational institutions established in 1994
Universities and colleges in Vancouver
Colleges in British Columbia
Vocational education in Canada